Harnai  is the capital of Harnai District in the Balochistan province of Pakistan. It was previously in Sibi District. It is located in the northeast of Balochistan province. The town is surrounded by the cities Ziarat, Loralai and the state capital, Quetta. The population is predominantly Pashtun followed by Baloch.  The language spoken in the town is Wanetsi or Tareeno mainly spoken by Spin Tareen's, a unique and archaic dialect of Pashto. There is also a thinly populated tribe in the town named Wanechi (not to be confused with Wanetsi language). The town is inhabited by majority of Pakhtun tribes like Tareen, Mushwani and Kakar and minority of Marri and Baloch.

History
The old name of Harnai was Zawara in Local Tareeno Language. Some people still pronounced Harnai as Zawara. The name Harnai refers to an influential Hindu personality, Harnam Das, supposed founder of Harnai town, the capital of Harnai District. The town is quite close to Loralai, Ziarat, Sibi, Mastung and Quetta. Harnai is surrounded by imposing hills on all sides. The encircling hill ranges have the resounding names of 'Khalifat' and 'Zarghun'. Loe sar Nekan (Zarghoon Gar) with an elevation of 3578 Meters is the highest mountain peak in the province of Baluchistan in the southwest of Pakistan is also situated in District Harnai. Harnai proper has a population of about 200,000. The majority of the population of Harnai are Tareens and they mostly speak a unique, Wanetsi (Tareeno) dialect of Pashto, which is considered by some linguists to be distinctive enough to be classified as its own language. According to linguist Prods Oktor Skjaervo: "The Pashto area split into two dialect groups at a pre-literary period, represented today on the one hand by all the dialects of modern Pashto and on the other by Wanetsi and by archaic remains in other southeast dialects."

Until 2007 Harnai had been a tehsil of Sibi District, in August the Balochistan Government announced the Harnai district would be created by splitting the Sibi district and forming the new district from Harnai and Shahrag tehsils and the sub-tehsil of Khost.

Geography
Harnai is surrounded by mountainous ranges, such as Koh e Zarghoon and Koh e Khalifat.

Climate
The minimum and maximum winter temperature of the area is -2˚C to 20˚C. The summer is extreme in the area and the minimum and maximum temperature fall between 20˚C to 48˚C. Harnai has a fertile rainy season during monsoon time. In general, Harnai has pleasant weather in winter season. The best to visit Harnai is February to April.

References

Populated places in Harnai District